Garth Stirrat (born 5 November 1968) is a New Zealand cricket umpire. He has stood in domestic matches in the 2016–17 Plunket Shield season and the 2016–17 Ford Trophy. He has also stood as an umpire in international matches featuring the New Zealand women's cricket team.

References

External links
 

1968 births
Living people
New Zealand cricket umpires
Sportspeople from Wellington City